The 1979 Five Nations Championship was the fiftieth series of the rugby union Five Nations Championship. Including the previous incarnations as the Home Nations and Five Nations, this was the eighty-fifth series of the northern hemisphere rugby union championship. Ten matches were played between 20 January and 17 March.

 were the champions for the second consecutive season, winning a record twenty-first outright title. They had also shared the championship on nine other occasions. In beating Scotland, Ireland and England they also won the Triple Crown for a record fourth successive season and extended their record number of Triple Crown wins to sixteen. This would be the last time that Wales won back-to-back championships until 2013.

Participants
The teams involved were:

Table

Squads

Results

External links

The official RBS Six Nations Site

Six Nations Championship seasons
Five Nations
Five Nations
Five Nations
Five Nations
Five Nations
Five Nations
 
Five Nations
Five Nations
Five Nations